Man-Elephant is the name of two fictional characters appearing in American comic books published by Marvel Comics.

Publication history
The first Man-Elephant first appeared in The Savage She-Hulk #17 and was created by David Anthony Kraft and Ed Hannigan.

The second Man-Elephant first appeared in The Sensational She-Hulk #51 and was created by Scott Benson, Tom Morgan, and Brad Joyce.

Fictional character biography

Manfred Ellsworth Haller

Manfred Ellsworth Haller is the designer and owner of Haller Hydraulics which is boasted as the world leader in hydraulics. Manfred designed a powerful elephant-like suit that would enable someone to explore hostile areas. He offered Sheriff Morris Walters a chance to prove its worth by capturing She-Hulk. Manfred believed that the publicity would endorse the suit. Drawing She-Hulk into action, Man-Elephant proved more than a match for her. Once the She-Hulk's believed crimes were groundless, Man-Elephant backed off realizing that the suit would also be a good potential for abuse.

Manfred Haller was later put out of business by Tony Stark and his assets were frozen. He traveled to Timbuktu where an Indian wise woman told him about Ganesah and gave him a gem shard from Cyttorak. This transforms Manfred into the elephant-like creature known as Behemoth who then defends the locals from Tuareg rebels.

Behemoth later tracked down She-Hulk to take revenge on her. He discovers that she is now a bounty hunter with her RV parked in New Jersey. However at the time, She-Hulk was in custody after helping the Lady Liberators in ousting a corrupt government of the country of Marinmer. She-Hulk's Skrull partner Jazinda posed as She-Hulk and was beaten by Behemoth. Behemoth turned Jazinda over to the government who placed her in a military medical facility to be studied. Lurking around in human form in case She-Hulk turned up, Manfred as Behemoth attacked She-Hulk only to be attacked by Thundra. In the confusion, Jazinda turned into Behemoth and escaped as the real Behemoth is defeated by She-Hulk.

Strong Guy later fought Behemoth in New York City where their fight led them to New York City's main switching station. Strong Guy defeated Behemoth by knocking him into the relays at the switching station. This resulted in New York City having a blackout.

Man-Elephant II

The second Man-Elephant was created by the publishers and distributors of Marvel Comics. Marvel's adaption of She-Hulk's encounter with the original Man-Elephant few years prior perpetuated and exaggerated a bit by the writers. Through unknown means, this Man-Elephant came to life and confronted the real She-Hulk. Appearing at Marvel Comics to discuss their treatment in the past, She-Hulk clashed with her exaggerated counterpart and the Man-Elephant. With technology from his other world, Man-Elephant used it to turn elephants into humanoid version similar to himself to back up his schemes. Even with their accelerated mutation, the Man-Elephants retained their peaceful and docile behavior with some confusion over their transformations. Inciting them into violence, the Man-Elephant led them against the She-Hulk doppelganger (which was also released when Man-Elephant escaped) and defeated her. The real She-Hulk appeared on the scene backed up by a Marvel Comics intern named Tommy who was dressed as and calling himself the Gopher. The Man-Elephants then panicked and stampeded all over their leader. She-Hulk then sent Man-Elephant and the other She-Hulk back to where they came from.

Powers and abilities
Manfred used an elephant-themed suit which boosted his strength. He later gained a part of the Cyttorak gem, which turns him into the elephant-like creature known as Behemoth, possessing superhuman strength and durability.

The second Man-Elephant has no powers, aside from being a humanoid elephant and possessing a devious nefarious mind.

References

External links
 Man-Elephant I at Comic Vine
 
 

Characters created by David Anthony Kraft
Comics characters introduced in 1983
Comics characters introduced in 1993
Marvel Comics characters with superhuman strength
Marvel Comics supervillains